Yin Style Baguazhang is a style of Baguazhang.

History
Yin Fu had multiple students, but is said to have taught his complete baguazhang system to only a few.  Of these students, Men Baozhen (門寶珍) taught Xie Peiqi. In  an interview with Xie Peiqi, dated to 1999, Xie stated that his teacher, Men Baozhen, was considered to be the third best pupil of Yin Fu, after "Wan Tong" Li (i.e. Li Yongqing) and Ma Gui (Yin's oldest disciple). Dr. Xie died in 2003 and his top student, He Jinbao, is now teaching the system.  Other famous students of Yin Fu included Yin Yuzhang (his fourth son), Cao Zhongsheng (who also learned from Ma Gui), Gong Baotian, and others.  Ma Gui, Yin Fu's first disciple, stated that he changed nothing in the bagua he learned from Yin Fu. Included among Ma Gui's students were Wang Peisheng, who is more famous for his Wu style taijiquan, and Liu Wanchuan.

Overview
Yin Style as passed down by Xie Peiqi is notable for having eight distinct animal styles within the body of the art.  In other words, Xie's Yin Style is a complete system, which is made up of other complete systems.  These include the eight animal systems as well as several 'unorthodox' systems, such as the Penetrating Palm and Backhand systems.  Each of the eight animal styles is related to one of the eight trigrams of the I Ching.  The following table describes this relationship:

Each animal is a complete system in its own right, possessing its own personality, skills, applications, and functions.  Each of the eight animal systems contains eight striking methods, and each striking method has seven strikes.  Three of those seven are considered the 'primary' strikes and are emphasized more than the others in single practice.  Therefore, the animal systems of Xie's Yin Style Bagua have a total of 448 unique strikes.  However, Xie's Yin Style Bagua also contains other unorthodox systems outside of the eight animals, such as Penetrating Palm and the Backhand systems.  Hence, there are more than 448 strikes, though 448 are contained within the animals.  (Note that the animal relationships with the bagua diagram are not unique to Xie's art; these relationships are also often used for other styles of bagua, including Cheng substyles, such as that of Sun Lutang.)

Other substyles of Yin include different forms and methods.  For example, Cao Zhongsheng's system's technical base is the 64 palms (also taught by Wang Peisheng); other substyles focus on only 8 main palms (such as that of Liu Zhenlin, Li Baosen, or other Men Baozhen lineages).  Gong Baotian's version has many forms and a strong emphasis on Yin Fu's Luohan forms.  Each substyle also includes many supplementary forms (such as luohanquan) and training methods (such as hand hardening methods).

Four Basic Practices
There are four basic practice methods in Xie Peiqi's Yin Style Baguazhang: standing, turning, striking, and changing.  These practices are the basic pillars of the style, and are all considered equally important.

Standing
The standing practices involve nine static strengthening postures specific to a given animal.  Each posture requires precise body alignment and distinct isometric pressures necessitating full body exertion to maintain properly.  These postures are undertaken to develop and check the structure of every part of the body.

Turning
Turning (or turning the circle), is the practice many people associate with Baguazhang.  "Yin style Bagua is the art of striking while you are moving.  You ceaselessly move and strike, and are always trying to get to the outside [of your opponent] by turning.  No matter what, position yourself to avoid the heavy blows and let the light ones fall.  It is within turning that these movements and techniques are honed to perfection or to a higher level.  All movements and techniques are linked smoothly together."

Striking
Striking is the most fundamental way of developing power in Yin Style Baguazhang.  It is introduced through the stationary drilling method, unaccompanied by footwork.  It is intended to establish the harmony between hand and waist that is necessary for generating power.

The moving strike practices consist of:

 One-step drilling method, of which there is the zig-zag stepping or dominating the side, straight stepping, or dominating the center, and closing or turning the back method.
 Two-step, or square drilling, which consists of advance-back-step, advance-advance, or back-step-advance, and back-step back-step.
 Three-step, or horizontal drilling method, which combines the stationary strike, advance step, and back-step.

Changing
Changing is most obvious when changing hands to face opposite directions.  Changing also includes the changing or redirecting of force, or alterations in stepping.

Animal Styles in Xie Peiqi's Yin Style

Commonalities Between the Animal Styles
Each animal style in Yin Style Baguazhang is its own complete system; however, each system contains practices and movements from all of the other animal  systems.  Example: when practicing forms in Yin Style Bagua, a practitioner may practice, for example, the Lion System Windmill Sweeping Strike Form.  The strikes come from the lion system, but the Windmill movements come from the Phoenix system.

Thus, each animal has a specific movement technique in addition to its 8 striking methods.  Each animal also has its own kicking technique, which is not included in its striking methods.

Qian Trigram Lion System
The lion is pure Yang energy, or hardness, and is one of two animals represented by a pure trigram; the other is the Unicorn.  The lion trigram is characterized by powerful and ferocious full-body force generated from the waist.  The lion's eight striking methods are: sweeping, cutting, chopping, hooking, shocking, blocking, seizing and grasping.

The lion's characteristic movement technique is Linking the Forms.

Kan Trigram Snake System

The Snake's striking methods are: shoulder, elbow, knee, hip, shooting, binding, entrapping, and grasping.  The style is characterized by a smooth and flowing motion of the force-palm, with many of the strikes targeted at vital organs.

The snake's characteristic movement technique is Moving with the Force.

Gen Trigram Bear System

The bear system is distinguished by a strategy of taking advantage from a losing position.  The Bear's striking methods are: rushing, penetrating, withdrawing, carrying, leaning, shocking, soft and following.  The Bear's power is generated from the back, and is short and blunt.

The bear's characteristic movement technique is Turning the Back.

Zhèn Trigram Dragon System

Known as the lifting and holding palm.  Its striking methods are: pushing, lifting, carrying, leading, moving, capturing, chopping and entering.  The Dragon's power is emitted through a forward motion of back and waist.  The Dragon style, although practiced differently in Yin Style, is the animal practiced by Cheng Style Baguazhang.

The dragon's characteristic movement technique is Lifting and Upholding.

Xun Trigram Phoenix System

In the phoenix system, force is emitted from the shoulders, and characterized by whipping action.  The striking methods are: dodging, extending, chopping, shocking, transforming, removing, curling in, and cutting.

The phoenix's characteristic movement technique is Windmill.

Li Trigram Rooster System

The rooster focuses on long, deep footwork with one's center of gravity close to the ground.  Power comes from the elbows.  The Rooster's striking methods are: dodging, extending, lifting, shifting, entering, whipping, rushing and stabbing.

The rooster's characteristic movement technique is Reclining Step (also known as Lying Step).

Kun Trigram Qilin/Unicorn System

The Unicorn is the opposite of the Lion, being pure Yin.  The Unicorn's striking methods are: sticking, kneading, soft, following, hip, striking, chopping and cutting.  It issues force by employing all joints to produce a flexible, snapping power.

The unicorn's characteristic movement technique is Reversing the Body.

Dui Trigram Monkey System

Concentrates on leg techniques, referred to as the interlocking leg.  Its striking methods are: bending, thrusting, straightening, hip, chopping, swinging, stopping, and ending.

The monkey's characteristic movement technique is Compacting the Body.

Distribution

Yin stylists are most concentrated in Beijing, where practitioners of the lineages of Ma Gui, Yin Yuzhang, Cao Zhongsheng, Li Baosen, Li Yongqing, Men Baozhen, and others still practice and teach today.  Certain Yin styles have moved to other locations as well, however, such as the Cui Zhendong lineage in Shanghai and the Gong Baotian lineage in Shanghai, Shandong, and Taiwan.  Famous practitioners in Beijing today include Zhang Zhao Ren, He Puren, Wang Shangzhi, Zhang Lie, Zhu Baozhen, Xu Shi Xi and He Jinbao.  Others include Huang Zhicheng of Shandong, He Jinghan of Taiwan, Michael Guen of California and Tu Kun-Yii of New Jersey, USA.

References

Baguazhang styles
Chinese martial arts
Neijia
I Ching